Angell Park Speedway has a 1/3 mile dirt racetrack located in Sun Prairie, Wisconsin. The track has been run by the city's fire department since 1903. Racing occurs every Sunday approximately Memorial Day until Labor Day.  Special racing events and the weather may alter the schedule. The races were sanctioned by the Badger Midget Auto Racing Association (BMARA), the oldest midget organization in the world.  Some events are co-sanctioned by the United States Automobile Club (USAC). BMARA sanctions several midget car events at other nearby tracks. The World of Outlaws held their first sprint car races at the track in August 2016.

In addition to the racetrack, the facility features the National Midget Auto Racing Hall of Fame, a pavilion, and the Sun Prairie Firemans Park in the Prairie. The park was built by the Sun Prairie community on September 18, 2007, and was dedicated on October 7, 2007. The project was led by Sun Prairie residents Rebecca Ketelson and Anita Holcomb. Leather's and Associates was the project architect.

History

The part was donated by Col. William Angell to the Sun Prairie Fire Department in 1903. The track is nationally known for its midget car races, which began racing in 1936. As of the 2008 season, it is the only track in the United States to host weekly midget car races. The track was closed between 1942 and 1945, since all racing in the United States was halted during World War II.

The Badger Midget Auto Racing Association (BMARA) began sanction at the track in 1946 when racing resumed after World War II. Night racing at Angell Park began in 1948. With the lights installed, Kelly Peters of Lake Forest, IL set fast time, won his heat and captured the first feature race run under the lights. From that point forward, weekly Sunday night racing has been held at the facility except for a few shortened seasons for minor contract disputes in the late 1960s and early 1970s.

The track began hosting its first non-midget car races in 2007 when an occasional touring event was added to its program and by 2010 every race evening featured a class from another track or a touring series. The Angell Park Speedway board and the sanctioning body BMARA had a fall out before the 2010 season. The track ran its own sanction during May 2010. At the end of the month weekly track operation halted for the 2010 season except for special events (two USAC midget weekends and the Fireman's Nationals). The track returned to occasional events in 2011 including BMARA sanction.

The track was closed in 2020 due to the COVID-19 pandemic. In January 2021, Hans Lein and SLS Promotions were announced as promoters of the track. In February 2021, Gregg McKarns was announced as the new promoter of the track instead. McKarns also promotes Madison International Speedway and the ARCA Midwest Tour. Angell Park hosted its first USAC Midget race at the track since 2015 and 47th overall. Tanner Thorson won his seventh race of the season.

Notable racers
Some midget car drivers come from New Zealand and Australia during their country's winter to race during the United States' summer between May and September. The 2008 season featured Michael Pickens from Auckland, New Zealand (who stayed at one of the other driver's house) and Matt Smith from Newcastle, Australia.

Several notable racers raced at the track in its regular weekly series:
Justin Allgaier
Tom Bigelow
A. J. Fike
Aaron Fike (2002 BMARA champion)
Stan Fox (1979 BMARA champion)
Jeff Gordon (four-time NASCAR Cup Series Champion)
Mel Kenyon
Michael Pickens (many time New Zealand National Midget champion)
Landy Scott (1947 BMARA champion and BMARA president from 1951 to 1959)

Fireman Nationals
The track's most notable event is its 50 lap Fireman Nationals midget car event.

1982 (overall) Bill Engelhart
1983 Kevin Olson 
1984 Dan Boorse 
1985 Rich Vogler 
1986 Kevin Olson (USAC)
1987 Kevin Olson (USAC)
1988 Kevin Doty (USAC)
1989 Kevin Doty (USAC)
1990 Kevin Doty (USAC)
1991 Stevie Reeves (USAC)
1992 Marty Davis 
1993 Page Jones (Parnelli Jones' son)
1994 Kevin Doty 
1995 Kevin Doty 
1996 Randy Koch 
1997 Kevin Olson 
1998 Kevin Olson 
1999 Dan Boorse 
2000 Jay Drake 
2001 Tracy Hines 
2002 Tracy Hines
2003 Davey Ray 
2004 Scott Hatton 
2005 Scott Hatton 
2006 (rained out)
2007 Jerry Coons Jr.
2008 Brady Bacon
2009 Josh Wise (USAC)
2010 Tracy Hines (USAC)
2011 (rained out)
2012 Caleb Armstrong
2013 Zach Daum
2014 Tanner Thorson (USAC)
2015 Rico Abreu (USAC)
2016 Carson Macedo (POWRI) / Robbie Ray (BMARA)
2017 Zach Daum
2018 Tanner Carrick
2019 Logan Seavey (POWRI)
2020 not held (COVID)
2021 Tanner Thorson (USAC)

Reference (1982-2020):

References

External links

BMARA (sanctioning body) official website
list of BMARA champions

Motorsport venues in Wisconsin
Buildings and structures in Dane County, Wisconsin
Tourist attractions in Dane County, Wisconsin
Midget car racing